The Ivan the Great Bell Tower (Kolokol'nya Ivan Velikiy) is a church tower inside the Moscow Kremlin complex. It was built in 1508 on Cathedral Square for the three Russian Orthodox cathedrals, namely the  Assumption (closest to the tower), the Archangel and the Annunciation, which do not have their own belfries. It serves as a part of Moscow Kremlin Museums.

History
From 1329, Moscow's first stone bell tower stood on this site, affiliated with the Church of St. Ivan of the Ladder-under-the Bell, hence the name "Ivan" in the title. This church was erected by Grand Duke Ivan Kalita, and was one of the first to be built in Moscow out of stone, rather than wood. During Grand Duke Ivan III’s major renovation of the Kremlin, he hired an Italian architect to replace this church.  Construction was begun in 1505, the year of Ivan’s death, and was completed three years later under his son Vasily III. Vasilly also ordered that a new and unprecedentedly large tower be erected on the foundations of the old tower as a monument to honour his father.

The new bell tower, completed in 1508, originally had two belfries on different levels and a height of around 60 meters. Because of its height, the tower also served as an observation point against fires and the approach of enemies.

There's a popular yet disputable legend, that when Napoleon captured Moscow in 1812 after the Battle of Borodino, he heard that the cross on the central dome of the Annunciation Cathedral had been cast in solid gold, and immediately gave orders that it should be taken down. But he confused the cathedral with the Ivan the Great Bell Tower, which only had a gilded iron cross. This cross resisted all attempts of French equipment and engineers to remove it from the tower. It was only after a Russian peasant volunteered to climb up to the dome that the cross was lowered on a rope. When he went up to Napoleon seeking a reward, the latter had him shot out of hand as a traitor to his fatherland.

Architecture
The Ivan the Great Bell Tower is an ensemble with three components. All of the buildings are made of brick, and are whitewashed in accord with the neighboring buildings of Cathedral Square.

Bells
The Ivan the Great Bell Tower today contains 22 bells. Of these, 18 small bells hang in the base and in the middle of the bell tower.

Notes

References
Klein, Mina. The Kremlin: Citadel of History. MacMillan Publishing Company (1973). 
Tropkin, Alexander. The Moscow Kremlin: history of Russia's unique monument. Publishing House "Russkaya Zhizn" (1980). ASIN: B0010XM7BQ

External links

Official Home Page
Ivan the Great Bell Tower Complex – museum site

Religious buildings and structures completed in 1508
Towers completed in the 16th century
Moscow Kremlin towers
Christian bell towers
Church buildings with domes
Museums in Moscow
Architecture museums
Cultural heritage monuments of federal significance in Moscow
Christianity in Moscow
Music in Moscow